The South Tyrolean People's Party (SVP) is a regionalist and autonomist political party in South Tyrol, an autonomous province with a German-speaking majority in northern Italy.

Founded on 8 May 1945, the SVP has roots in the Deutscher Verband, a confederation of German-speaking parties formed in 1919 after the annexation of South Tyrol by Italy, which shared many of the same leading figures as the SVP. An ethnic catch-all party, the SVP is aimed at representing South Tyrol's German-speaking population as well as Ladin speakers, and is mainly Christian-democratic but nevertheless quite diverse, including conservatives, liberals and social democrats. The party gives special attention also to the interests of farmers, which make up a good deal of its electorate.

From 1948 to 2013 the party retained an absolute majority in the Provincial Council. Its best result was 67.8% in 1948, its worst 41.9% in 2018. The SVP had a long-lasting alliance with Christian Democracy (and the Italian Socialist Party) and, since 1994, with some of its successor parties, including the Italian People's Party and the Democratic Union of Alto Adige. In 1998 the SVP formed a coalition with the Democrats of the Left, replaced by the Democratic Party in 2009. That coalition lasted ten years, until the party chose to team up with the local section of Lega Nord / Lega in 2019.

At the European level, the SVP is a member of the European People's Party (EPP).

Recent history
In 1989 Silvius Magnago, long-time SVP leader and Governor of South Tyrol since 1960, handed his office to Luis Durnwalder, who would keep the post until 2013. Under Durnwalder's long reign, the SVP continued to be the largest party in the Province, garnering more than 50% of the vote in most elections, despite growing competition, chiefly from right-wing parties. Durnwalder managed to keep the party, often riven in internal disputes between opposing factions, united.

The SVP joined the European People's Party as an observer member in 1993.

In the 1996 general election the SVP was affiliated to The Olive Tree (on the Populars for Prodi list, which included primarily the Italian People's Party), and also the 2001 general election (on its own list).

2003–2006 elections
In the 2003 provincial election the SVP won 55.6% of the vote and 21 provincial councillors out of 35. Durnwalder, Governor since 1989, was returned for the fourth time in office, at the head of a coalition composed by the Democrats of the Left (DS) and the Democratic Union of Alto Adige.

In the 2004 European Parliament election the SVP formed an electoral alliance with The Olive Tree joint list, including the DS. The party's share of votes fell below 50% for the first time, to 46.7% (–9.3pp from 1999, mainly because of the big win of the Greens (13.2%, +6.5%). However Michl Ebner was elected MEP with more than 90,000 preferences and a Green, Sepp Kusstatscher (a former member of the internal left of the SVP), was elected too.

Also in 2004 the centrist Siegfried Brugger, party chairman since 1992, stepped down and was replaced by Elmar Pichler Rolle, another centrist.

In the 2006 general election the party was part of the victorious The Union centre-left coalition, and garnered four deputies, including one for its sister-party in Trentino, the Trentino Tyrolean Autonomist Party (PATT) – long-serving Siegfried Brugger, Karl Zeller, Johann Georg Widmann and PATT's Giacomo Bezzi –, and three senators – Helga Thaler Ausserhofer (representing the party's conservative wing), Oskar Peterlini (from the party's social-democratic faction) and Manfred Pinzger.

2008–2009 elections
In the 2008 general election the party obtained 44.3% (–9.1pp from 2006 and –16.2pp from 2001), returning only two deputies, Siegfried Brugger and Karl Zeller. In the Senate election, thanks to the plurality voting system, the SVP got its three senators – Helga Thaler Ausserhofer, Oskar Peterlini and Manfred Pinzger – re-elected. The low number of elects in the Chamber was due both to the strong showing of Die Freiheitlichen (9.4%) on the right and the decision not to enter in alliance for the Chamber of Deputies either with the centre-left led by the Democratic Party (PD, 18.0%) – successor of the DS – or the centre-right led by The People of Freedom (PdL,16.0%).

In the 2008 provincial election the SVP won 48.1% of the vote in the Province (–7.5%), while its right-wing rivals (The Freedomites, South Tyrolean Freedom and Union for South Tyrol) gained a combined 21.5% of the vote. During the electoral campaign the party did not endorse its traditional counterparts in Trentino (the Daisy Civic List/Union for Trentino, UpT, and the PATT), in order not to hurt the relations with Lega Nord (LN), whose Trentino section, Lega Nord Trentino, provided the opposition candidate, Sergio Divina. Despite rumors on an alliance with Lega Nord Alto Adige – Südtirol, after the election the SVP continued its alliance with the PD.

In April 2009 Richard Theiner, a member of the Arbeitnehmer ("employees") left-leaning wing, was elected party chairman, due to an agreement between the opposing factions. Since then he was assisted by three deputy chairpersons: Thomas Widmann (Wirtschaft or "business" faction), Martha Stocker and Paola Bioc Gasser (representative of the Ladin section). The latter was replaced by Daniel Alfreider in 2012.

In the 2009 European Parliament election, due to the absence of its rival parties on the right, the SVP won 52.1% of the vote, electing Herbert Dorfmann.

2013–2014 elections
The SVP contested the 2013 general election as part of the centre-left coalition, Italy. Common Good. Some long-serving MPs, notably Siegfried Brugger and Helga Thaler Ausserhofer, chose not to run for re-election and the party selected its candidates through a primary election.

In the general election the SVP won 44.2% of the provincial vote (–0.1pp from 2008) and, being part of the coalition winning the national majority premium, obtained five deputies: Albrecht Plangger, Renate Gebhard, Daniel Alfreider, PATT's Mauro Ottobre and Manfred Schullian. For the Senate, the SVP ran alone in the constituencies of Merano and Brixen, winning both: in Merano outgoing deputy Karl Zeller took 53.5%, while in Brixen Hans Berger 55.4%. The SVP, in alliance with the PD, the UpT and the PATT, contributed also to the election of centre-left or autonomist candidates in the constituency of Bolzano and in those of Trentino.

On 21 April, in a party primary, the SVP selected Arno Kompatscher as its head of the list for the 2013 provincial election, in place of Durnwalder. Kompatscher, 42-year-old mayor of Völs am Schlern, won 82.4% of the vote, while former SVP leader Elmar Pichler Rolle a mere 17.6%.

In the October election the SVP won 45.7% of the vote in the Province (–2.4pp) and lost its 65-year-long absolute majority. Both the German right-wing parties (whose combined share of the vote was 27.2%, +5.7%) and the Greens (8.7%, +2.9%) gained votes. Kompatscher obtained more than 80,000 preference votes and was set to be appointed Governor by the Provincial Council. Its coalition government included, as usual, the PD.

In May 2014 Theiner was replaced by Philipp Achammer as party's chairman. Daniel Alfreider, Zeno Christanell and Angelika Wiedmer were appointed vice chairpersons. Kompatscher and 28-year-old Achammer formed an entirely new leadership team and represented the party's renewal.

In the 2014 European Parliament election the SVP won 48.0% of the vote in the Province and Dorfmann was re-elected to the European Parliament.

2018–2019 elections
The SVP, which again chose its candidates through a primary election, contested the 2018 general election in a joint list with the PATT, within the centre-left coalition. The German right-wing parties did not contest the election, leading the SVP to obtain 48.8% of the vote in the Province (+4.6pp). However, due to the new electoral system, it secured four deputies, including one for the PATT, and three senators. For the Chamber, Albrecht Plangger was elected in Meran (61.2%), Renate Gebhard in Brixen (65.0%), and Manfred Schullian and PATT's Emanuela Rossini from the PR list. For the Senate, Julia Unterberger was elected in Merano (61.1%), Meinhard Durnwalder in Brixen (66.5%), and Dieter Steger from the PR list. The SVP's support granted the election of PD's candidates for the Chamber and the Senate in Bolzano, but for the first time the centre-left lost badly in Trentino, where the LN – re-styled as "Lega" – became the largest party.

In the 2018 provincial election incumbent Governor Kompatscher was the party's leading candidate. In the election on 21 October 2018, the party gained 41.9%, (–3.8pp). The PD, SVP's traditional ally, did so poorly that the SVP needed to find a new coalition partner: after long negotiations, the party chose to team up with the local section of Lega Nord in 2019. Additionally, for the 2019 European Parliament election, the party formed an electoral pact with the other two main members of the European People's Party (EPP) from Italy, Silvio Berlusconi's Forza Italia (FI) and the Union of the Centre (UdC). In the 2019 European Parliament election the SVP won 46.5% of the vote in the Province and Dorfmann was re-elected to the European Parliament.

2022 elections
In the 2022 general election the SVP decided to run independently with PATT and the Trentino Project. In response, the centre-left coalition made deals with the Team K and Greens after this decision.

Ideology and factions

The SVP is an example of a catch-all party. Its ideology ranges from Christian democracy to social democracy, due to the virtual absence of a true social-democratic rival party in the region. In German-speaking valleys the SVP had for decades almost no opposition, apart from Die Freiheitlichen, South Tyrolean Freedom and Citizens' Union for South Tyrol on the right and the Greens on the left.

In the years the SVP suffered many splits reflecting the diverse composition of the party (Tyrolean Homeland Party, Social Progressive Party of South Tyrol and Social Democratic Party of South Tyrol) and many SVP leading members left the party in order to join other parties, notably including Alfons Benedikter, a right-winger who launched the Union for South Tyrol in 1989, Christian Waldner, a conservative liberal who launched The Freedomites in 1992, Sepp Kusstatscher, a leftist who joined the Greens in 1999, and finally Roland Atz, a right-winger who switched to Lega Nord Alto Adige – Südtirol in 2008. The Party of Independents/Freedom Party of South Tyrol, the South Tyrolean Homeland Federation, the Union for South Tyrol and The Freedomites can thus be all considered splits of the SVP.

Within the party it is possible to identify three main internal factions:
Landwirtschaft (Agriculture), representing the interests of farmers; the faction, which had in Luis Durnwalder, Governor from 1989 to 2013, its main representative in government, notably includes Herbert Dorfmann and Hans Berger.
Wirtschaft (Economy), representing small business; the faction is led by Gerhard Brandstätter and notably includes Helga Thaler Ausserhofer, a conservative, Manfred Pinzger, Karl Zeller, Thomas Widmann and Dieter Steger; Arno Kompatscher wields strong support among the faction.
Arbeitnehmer (Labour), the social-democratic faction and political arm of the Union of South Tyrolean Independent Trade Unions (ASGB); the faction, recently led by Reinhold Perkmann, Rosmarie Pamer, and Cristoph Gufler, notably includes Oskar Peterlini, the most left-wing SVP member in the Italian Parliament so far, Richard Theiner and Renate Gebhard.

Siegfried Brugger and Elmar Pichler Rolle, who led the party in 1992–2004 and 2004–2009 respectively, are centrist figures who worked for preserving party unity. In order to prevent the break-up of the party along right-left lines, in 2008 Perkmann, leader of the Arbeitnehmer, proposed a "federal reform" of the party in order to preserve its catch-all nature and simultaneously give more autonomy to its internal factions, which have now an official status in party organization. The result was a mild reform of the party and the election to the party leadership in 2009 of a ticket composed by a leading member of the Arbeitnehmer, Richard Theiner, and a leading member of the Wirtschaft faction, Thomas Widmann, plus Martha Stocker, a close ally of Durnwalder.

The factional divisions between party members were reflected also on the vote of confidence on the Berlusconi IV Cabinet: Pinzger and Thaler Ausserhofer abstained, while Brugger, Zeller and Peterlini voted against. This kind of divisions continued during the legislature, with senators, excluding Peterlini, supporting some of the government's policies and deputies often opposing the same measures.

The Young Generation (Junge Generation, JG) is the youth movement of the party, including all members at the age of 14 to 30.

The SVP is a member of the European People's Party (EPP), and its MEP sits in the EPP Group in the European Parliament.

Popular support
The electoral results of the SVP in South Tyrol since 1948 are shown in the chart below

The electoral results of the SVP in South Tyrol since 1953 are shown in the table below.

Chamber of Deputies

European Parliament

Electoral results

Landtag of South Tyrol

Italian Parliament

European Parliament

Leadership
Chairman: Erich Amonn (1945–1948), Josef Menz-Popp (1948–1951), Toni Ebner (1951–1952), Otto von Guggenberg (1952–1954), Karl Tinzl (1954–1956), Toni Ebner (1956–1957), Silvius Magnago (1957–1991), Roland Riz (1991–1992), Siegfried Brugger (1992–2004), Elmar Pichler Rolle (2004–2009), Richard Theiner (2009–2014), Philipp Achammer (2014–present)
Honorary chairman: Silvius Magnago (1991–2010)
Secretary: Josef Raffeiner (1945–1947), Otto von Guttenberg (1947–1952), Albuin Forer (1952–1953), Vinzenz Stötter (1953–1954), Ivo Perathoner (1954–1957), Hans Stanek (1957–1965), Josef Atz (1965–1978), Bruno Hosp (1978–1989), Hartmann Gallmetzer (1989–1997), Thomas Widmann, (1997–2003), Michael Mühlberger (2004), Alexander Mittermair (2004–2009), Philipp Achammer (2009–2013), Martin Alber (2013–2014), Manuel Massl (2014–2016), Gerhard Duregger (2017–2019), Stefan Premstaller (2019–present)

Further reading

References

Sources
History of 60 years of the SVP, 1945–2005
Provincial Council of Bolzano – Historical Archive
Trentino Alto-Adige Region – Elections
Provincial Government of Bolzano – Elections
Cattaneo Institute – Archive of Election Data
South Tyrol—Parties and Elections in Europe
Ministry of the Interior – Historical Archive of Elections
Günther Pallaver, Political parties in Alto Adige from 1945 to 2005
Anton Holzer, Die Südtiroler Volkspartei, Kulturverlag, Thaur (Tyrol) 1991, 
Joachim Goller, Die Brixner Richtungen. Die Südtiroler Volkspartei, das katholische Lager und der Klerus, Studienverlag, Innsbruck/Wien/Bozen 2007,

External links
Official website
Wirtschaft faction
Arbeitnehmer faction
Landwirtschaft faction

1945 establishments in Italy
Agrarian parties
Christian democratic parties in Italy
Member parties of the European People's Party
Parties represented in the European Parliament
Political parties established in 1945
Political parties in South Tyrol
Political parties of minorities
Pro-European political parties in Italy
Regionalist parties in Italy